Elizabeth Devereux may refer to:

Elizabeth Devereux (writer)

See also
Elizabeth Devereux-Rochester